The son of Omar Abdur Rahman, Asim Abdulrahman was described as "among the closest" of Osama bin Laden's followers in the days following the September 11th attacks in 2001.

Under the kunya Abu Asim, he was believed to lead an Egyptian militant group that allied itself with the World Islamic Front as of 1998.

In early November 2001, the Taliban government announced they were bestowing Afghan citizenship on him, as well as bin Laden, Ayman al-Zawahiri, Saif al-Adel and Mohammed Atef.

Footnotes

Living people
20th-century births
Year of birth missing (living people)